The Arch of Hadrian may refer to:
Arch of Hadrian (Athens) in Greece
Arch of Hadrian (Capua) in Italy
Arch of Hadrian (Jerash) in Jordan.